Epigonus of Ambracia (fl. 6th century BC) was a Greek musician from Ambracia in South Epirus, who was admitted to a citizenship at Sicyon, where he lived, performed and taught. The epigonion (string instrument) was invented, or at least introduced in Greece by Epigonus. He was a contemporary of Lasus of Hermione.

References
Athenaeus iv.183d and xiv, 637f.1.7.
The Science of Harmonics in Classical Greece by Andrew Barker

Ancient Greek musicians
Ancient Epirotes
6th-century BC Greek people
Ancient Greek inventors
Ancient Sicyonians